Gloria Giner de los Ríos García (28 March 1886 – 6 February 1970) was a Spanish teacher at the Escuela Normal Superior de Maestras and the Institución Libre de Enseñanza. They also worked to change the androcentric canon of geographical studies to include women.

She lived in exile during the Francoist Spain era, forming part of the intellectual elite that carried out educational, philological, literary, legal, and cultural work. Her family had close connections to that of poet Federico García Lorca.

Biography
Gloria Giner de los Ríos García was born in Madrid on 28 March 1886. After finishing high school in 1906 and teaching in 1908, she completed her training by attending classes at the Institución Libre de Enseñanza and taking courses in art, pedagogy, and philosophy.

Marriage, family, and social life
On 1 July 1912, Giner married Fernando de los Ríos, who had obtained the Chair of Law at the University of Granada. It was in this city that the couple took up residence, and in which Gloria was a teacher at the Normal School, by right of consort at first, and later in her own position. A year later, their daughter  was born. In Granada, the Ríos Giner family became friends with the García Lorca family, with Manuel de Falla, and with Berta Wilhelmi and her husband Eduardo Domínguez. Wilhelmi had been in contact with the Institución Libre de Enseñanza and had organized some community schools in Almuñécar. With her collaboration, Giner organized the education of her daughter Laura and other children, including Isabel García Lorca, in order to separate them from Granada's private education system.

Laura de los Ríos and Isabel García Lorca
Federico García Lorca was one of the select circle of friends of the Ríos family. He dedicated the poem Romance sonámbulo to Fernando and Gloria, and was the one who introduced their daughters, Laura de los Ríos and Isabel García Lorca. The friendship between the latter was very intense and lasting. They became sisters-in-law when Laura married Federico's younger brother . In an interview, Isabel Garcia Lorca recalled:

Laura, in another interview, told of her mother's life in Granada:

Professional career
In 1931, the Provisional Government of the Republic appointed her husband Minister of Justice, and in December, Minister of Public Instruction. Giner told her daughter, "I'm not going to give up my career and live as a minister." Nonetheless, she performed some ceremonial functions and accompanied her husband on trips through Spain. In 1932 she was on leave as a teacher at the Normal School, but continued teaching at the Institución Libre de Enseñanza. In 1933, after her husband resigned from government office, she rejoined teaching by accepting a position in Zamora. For three courses she lived alone in a hotel room three days a week, returning to Madrid for the rest of the week. In Zamora, as in Granada, society shunned her for being the wife of a socialist and not attending religious services.

Exile
At the end of September 1936, Fernando de los Ríos was appointed ambassador of Spain to the United States, a position he held until March 1939. Gloria Giner moved to Washington, D.C. with her daughter, her mother, and a nephew of her husband. Fernanda Urruti, Fernando's mother, would later join them. In Washington, Giner was invited to several meetings that Eleanor Roosevelt organized in the White House. During the Civil War, Fernando de los Ríos was separated from his professorship at the University of Madrid. In 1939, the Franco government definitively separated him from his chair and dismissed him.

Fernando de los Ríos taught at The New School for Social Research in New York, an institution founded to welcome European intellectuals who emigrated for political reasons. Giner was a professor at Columbia University. The Ríos-Giner family lived in exile in the United States, which did not recognize Spanish Republican exiles and subjected those who wanted to enter to immigration laws. However, university students and artists were exempt from the rigid immigration quota, provided they were endorsed by US citizens or claimed by a university. Gloria was one of the exiled academics who passed through American universities and formed an intellectual elite.

In 1942, her daughter Laura married Francisco García Lorca, younger brother of the poet Federico, in the Mead Chapel of Middlebury College, where both were professors at the Spanish School. The couple had three daughters, and the family lived together in a New York apartment.

In addition to preparing classes, writing poems, and working on the publication of her works, Giner took care of her three granddaughters, took them out for walks and, if necessary, took them on the bus and subway in New York.

In 1949, Fernando de los Ríos died. Over 50 personalities of politics and culture attended the funeral. José de los Ríos – the younger brother of Fernando and Francisco García Lorca – presided over the dual family. Fernando's wife, mother, and daughter stayed at the house during the funeral, in accordance with Spanish custom at the time.

Return to Spain
Gloria Giner returned to Spain with her daughter's family in 1965. She died in Madrid on 6 February 1970.

Teaching methods
Gloria Giner and her great friend  worked together on the teaching of geography in order to connect with students. Giner defended the formative capacity of the plastic arts "as a real basis for the teaching of history in the first years of the formation of the culture of the child". Her 1935 book Cien lecturas históricas became a prominent text for educational reformers inspired by the work of Rafael Altamira.

With Altamira and Maria Montessori as references, they developed didactic methods that, in Serrano's words, revolved around "enthusiastic observation". This consisted of teaching geography in dialogue with the students, strengthening their physical and emotional relationship with the environment. Another component of enthusiastic observation was emotional. Impositions of rote memorization were eliminated. In Giner's words, "the soul was educated and the spirit strengthened".

Serrano and Giner also advocated for the meaningful inclusion of women in the androcentric canon of studies on geography. The Dictionary of the Royal Spanish Academy had, in 1803, included the meaning of the word hombre (man) to refer to all mankind. Taking the term as inclusive of women, they understood that it forced men to relate to nature as women did. Serrano considered that rendering the androcentric references in geography meaningless would foster a "new creative, loving, anti-destructive, and anti-war humanity". In the opinion of professor Ana I. Simón Alegre, this teaching, in the language of the 21st century, could be called the development of environmental education or the first manifestations of ecofeminism.

Giner's last book, Por tierras de España (1962), also incorporated audio-lingual teaching methods.

Works
 Historia de la pedagogía (1910)
 Weimer, Hermann 1872-1942 (translation)
 Geografía Primer grado. Aspectos de la naturaleza y vida del hombre en la tierra (1919)
 Geografía: Primer grado (1919), with Federico Ribas (1890–1952)
 Geografía general. El cielo, la Tierra y el hombre (1935)
 Cien lecturas históricas (1935)
 Lecturas geográficas. Espectáculos de la naturaleza, paisajes, ciudades y hombres (1936)
 Romances de los ríos de España (1943)
 Manual de historia de la civilización española (1951)
 Cumbres de la civilización española: Interpretación del espíritu español individualizado en diecinueve figuras representativas (1955)
 El paisaje de Hispanoamérica a través de su literatura: (antología) (1958)
 Introducción a la historia de la civilización española (1959)
 Por tierras de España (1962), with Luke Nolfi,

References

Further reading

External links

 Works at the Biblioteca Nacional de España Catalog 

1886 births
1970 deaths
20th-century Spanish women writers
20th-century Spanish writers
Columbia University faculty
Exiles of the Spanish Civil War in the United States
German–Spanish translators
Spanish educational theorists
Spanish geographers
Spanish translators
Women educational theorists
Women geographers
Writers from Madrid
20th-century geographers
20th-century translators